Acinoeuphranta is a genus of tephritid  or fruit flies in the family Tephritidae.

There is only one species placed in Acinoeuphranta, Acinoeuphranta zeylanica (Hardy, 1971).

References

Trypetinae
Tephritidae genera